thumb | An 1899 advertisement for the company   
William R. Trigg Company, also the Trigg Shipbuilding Company, was an inland shipyard in Richmond, Virginia. The shipyard produced torpedo boats and destroyers and the protected cruiser USS Galveston (CL-19) for the United States Navy. It was founded by William R. Trigg, who also owned the Richmond Locomotive Works in 1899. The yard went into receivership and ceased operations by 1903, the same year its founder died.

References

Richmonder took risk on shipbuilding business

Defunct shipbuilding companies of the United States
Manufacturing companies based in Richmond, Virginia